The Unknown Man of Shandigor is a 1967 Swiss drama film directed by Jean-Louis Roy. It was entered into the 1967 Cannes Film Festival.

Cast
 Marie-France Boyer as Sylvaina / Sylvaine
 Ben Carruthers as Manual / Manuel
 Daniel Emilfork as Von Krantz, the savant
 Howard Vernon as Yank / Bobby Gun
 Jacques Dufilho as Russian / Schoskatovich
 Serge Gainsbourg as The king of bold
 Jacqueline Danno as Esther
 Marcel Imhoff as Yvan, the assistant
 Gabriel Arout as Signe 1
 Marc Fayolle as A spy
 Adrien Nicati as A spy
 Serge Nicoloff as A spy
 Georges Wod as A spy
 Georges Caspari as A spy

References

External links

1967 films
1960s French-language films
1967 drama films
Swiss black-and-white films
Cold War spy films
Swiss drama films
French-language Swiss films